Expo Science Park is a science park in Yuseong-gu to the north of Daejeon, South Korea, built for Taejŏn Expo '93. Facilities at Expo Park included a garden, amusement park, and observation tower. While the tower and some buildings remain, most of the expo buildings have now been removed. The Daejeon Convention Center became the first convention center in the city in 2008 and opened their second building in 2022. 

In September 2014, the Ministry of Science, ICT and Future Planning announced that Expo Science Park would be demolished in stages from November 2014 to August 2015. However, in recognition of their historic value, Hanbit Tower, the international conference room, and the simulation pavilion would be kept. In November 2014, the Shinsegae consortium won a bid to build the science complex within the park.

In September 2017, Studio Cube, a state-run film studio complex on the site of the park, formally opened its doors to film and drama production.

As of 2018, the site is hosting the headquarters complex for the Institute for Basic Science.

In August 2021, the 2nd Expo Bridge, connecting the park with Seo-gu, opened.

References

Science parks in South Korea
Parks in Daejeon
World's fair sites in South Korea
Institute for Basic Science